Bobby "Robert" Powell (born June 16, 1965) is an American racing driver who won the NASCAR Weekly Series national championship in 1988. He competed in 15 NASCAR Busch Series (now Xfinity Series) races spread throughout in the 1980s and 1990s.

Driving career
Driving an asphalt Late Model that he owned, Powell won 23 of the 31 NASCAR-sanctioned races that he entered at race tracks in Summerville, Myrtle Beach, and Anderson (all in South Carolina).

Powell races in the NASCAR Busch Series in the 1980s and 1990s. He scattered 15 starts with 1989 being the season where he had more than one start. His best career result was a fourth-place finish at Lanier National Speedway; his others Top 10 finishes were an 8th at Myrtle Beach Speedway, a tenth at South Boston Speedway and a tenth at Hickory Motor Speedway.

Powell ran 32 races in the NASCAR Southeast Series, with 5 Top 5s, 13 Top 10s and 3 pole-positions.

He also ran one USAR Hooters Pro Cup Series race in 2000, he finished 7th and led 20 laps.

Arrest
He was arrested in December 2014 in Goose Creek, SC for manufacturing methamphetamine. Many materials for the manufacture of methamphetamine were found in his garbage can.

References

External links
 

NASCAR drivers
CARS Tour drivers
Living people
Racing drivers from South Carolina
1965 births